Jonathan Matthews Humphreys (born 27 February 1969) is a former Wales international rugby union player. He is now an Assistant Coach for Wales.

Rugby Union career

Playing career

Amateur career

Humphreys played for Kenfig Hill RFC and Cardiff as a Hooker.

Professional career

Humphreys went on to become a leading figure and terrace favourite at Cardiff when rugby union became openly professional in 1995. In 2001 / 2002 he had a short stint as a National Development Officers with the Sports Council for Wales. However, in 2002, he signed for Bath Rugby. He was with the club for three years.

International career

Humphreys was in the Wales squad during the 1995 Rugby World Cup and 1999 Rugby World Cup. He captained the Welsh side.

Coaching career

Ospreys

He was forwards coach at the Ospreys from 2006 to 2009.

Scotland

From June 2013 to May 2017, Humphreys has been the forwards coach for the Scottish national side.

Glasgow Warriors

In October 2016 it was announced that Humphreys would be a new Assistant Coach for Glasgow Warriors from May 2017.

Wales

On 19 December 2018, it was announced that Humphreys would be the new forwards coach for Wales.

References

1969 births
Bath Rugby players
Cardiff RFC players
Kenfig Hill RFC players
Living people
Rugby union players from Bridgend
Wales international rugby union players
Wales rugby union captains
Welsh rugby union coaches
Welsh rugby union players
Glasgow Warriors coaches